Beste Kökdemir (born 29 August 1993) is a Turkish actress.

Early life
Beste Kökdemir was born on 29 August 1993 in Sinop, Turkey. She completed her primary and secondary education in Sinop. She was later enrolled in Haliç University Fashion Design Department. Kökdemir is known for her love of tattoos. At the age of 12, she had a tattoo written "Bring me Back to Life" on her left arm. In addition she has another tattoo written "One Day" on her right wrist.

Career
She began her acting career in 2012, and it was reported that she was cast in Bir Çocuk Sevdim, however, in the last minute she was replaced by Gülcan Aslan. She made her television debut with Çıplak Gerçek and depicted the character of Hazal with Taner Ölmez. In 2013, she appeared in the hit crime series Behzat Ç. Bir Ankara Polisiyesi. In 2014, she appeared in the youth series Not Defteri and portrayed the character of Selin. In 2015, she joined the cast of the hit series Poyraz Karayel (Season 2). In the same year she appeared in the series Tatlı Küçük Yalancılar adaptation of "Pretty Little Liars" and portrayed the character of Açelya. The show also starred Şükrü Özyıldız, Bensu Soral, Büşra Develi, Melisa Şenolsun and Dilan Çiçek Deniz. Kökdemir has stated that she is very self-assured and her dream is to acquire an Oscar in the future.

In 2016, she made her appearance in the historical fiction series Muhteşem Yüzyıl: Kösem and portrayed the character of Meleksima Hatun. In 2017, she made her cinematic debut in the movie Taş and depicted the character of Suna. In 2018, she made her debut in the series Kalbimin Sultanı and portrayed the role of Hoşyar Kadın, wife of the Ottoman Sultan Mahmud II, an alluring, extremely magnanimous and compassionate woman. She joined in hit series "Hayat Şarkısı".In 2019, she appeared in the series Her Yerde Sen and depicted the character of Eylül.

Personal life
As of 2020, Kökdemir is rumored to be dating Turkish actor Burak Deniz.

Filmography

References

External links
 
 

Living people
1993 births
Turkish television actresses
Turkish YouTubers
21st-century Turkish actresses
Turkish film actresses
People from Sinop, Turkey